Gmina Koszyce is a rural gmina (administrative district) in Proszowice County, Lesser Poland Voivodeship, in southern Poland.

Villages

Gmina Koszyce contains the villages and settlements of Biskupice, Dolany, Filipowice, Jaksice, Jankowice, Koszyce, Książnice Małe, Książnice Wielkie, Łapszów, Malkowice, Modrzany, Morsko, Piotrowice, Przemyków, Rachwałowice, Siedliska, Sokołowice, Witów, Włostowice and Zagaje.

Neighbouring gminas
Gmina Koszyce is bordered by the gminas of Bejsce, Drwinia, Kazimierza Wielka, Nowe Brzesko, Opatowiec, Proszowice, Szczurowa and Wietrzychowice.

References
Polish official population figures 2006

External links

Koszyce
Proszowice County